Joaquín Sorribas Ariño (born 27 June 1978 in Huesca, Aragon) is a Spanish retired professional footballer who played as a defensive midfielder.

External links

1978 births
Living people
People from Huesca
Sportspeople from the Province of Huesca
Spanish footballers
Footballers from Aragon
Association football midfielders
Segunda División players
Segunda División B players
SD Huesca footballers
Valencia CF Mestalla footballers
CD Binéfar players
Real Zaragoza B players
UD Almería players
AD Ceuta footballers
Real Unión footballers
Burgos CF footballers
CD Toledo players